The Canadian Snowbird Association (CSA) is a national, not-for-profit organization dedicated to defending and improving the rights and privileges of travelling Canadians (the so-called snowbirds).

Founded in 1992,  in Lakeland, Florida, the CSA was formed when 1,092 Canadians staged a rally opposing the reduction of payments, by several Canadian provinces, for out-of-country emergency medical care, a right enshrined in the portability section of the Canada Health Act (Sec. 11(1)(b)(ii)).

CSA works with various government bodies in Canada and the U.S. to advocate on behalf of its members on issues such as health.

In 2017, the Canadian Snowbird Association has approximately 110,000 members across Canada.

Advocacy

The advocacy efforts of the Canadian Snowbird Association are informed by the following principles:
 To act upon and create a beneficial environment for members by promoting and protecting their interests and rights;
 To act in anticipation of possible changes in existing programs and services that may have adverse effects;
 To act in response to needs for new and appropriate services and programs.

The lobbying initiatives of the CSA are financed by the donations made by the membership.

Canada

Since its inception, the Canadian Snowbird Association has been involved in working with governments across Canada on issues of importance to travelling Canadians. In 1993, the government of New Brunswick proposed reducing the amount of time that residents could spend outside of the province, while maintaining their provincial health coverage from six months to 90 days. As a result of the advocacy work of the CSA, the New Brunswick government eventually shelved the proposal and maintained the existing six-month residency requirement.

Two years later, in 1995, the CSA worked with the Ontario government in order to restore the out-of-country emergency care in-patient rate of $400 per day. Under Premier Bob Rae, the Ontario government had reduced the reimbursement rate for emergency in-patient care from $400 per day to $100 per day. Similarly, in 1999, the CSA again worked with the Ontario government to increase the length of time that residents could be outside of the province, from six to seven months, and still retain health coverage under the Ontario Health Insurance Plan (OHIP). This increase was made in conjunction with another policy change which allowed beneficiaries of the Ontario Drug Benefit Program (ODB) to receive up to a 200-day supply of prescription medication for travel purposes.

In 2007, in an attempt to put pressure on the provincial and territorial governments to begin complying with the portability section of the Canada Health Act, then federal Minister of Health Tony Clement wrote a letter to every Minister of Health, reminding them of their obligations under the Canada Health Act.
 
The Canadian Snowbird Association also worked to introduce mail-in ballots, in Ontario, for eligible electors who are outside of the province during a provincial election. Since 2002, the CSA had recommended to the Ontario government that the Election Act be amended to include an absentee ballot option for temporarily absent residents. In 2010, An Act to Amend the Election Act and the Election Finances Act was passed in the Ontario legislature, which made the necessary changes to allow Ontario residents to vote by mail-in ballot during a general election.

The CSA has also worked with governments in Western Canada in order to secure more travel-friendly policies for long-term vacationing residents. In 2012, the CSA was instrumental in urging the Saskatchewan government to allow residents to get up to six months of prescription drugs processed at one time through the Saskatchewan Drug Plan. Prior to this change, drug plan beneficiaries had to submit two separate receipts for two three-month supplies. This reduction in red tape has resulted in less upfront costs and hassle for travelling residents of Saskatchewan.

At the federal level, the CSA recommended that the Canadian government introduce a Canadian passport with a 10-year validity period. In 2013, Ottawa implemented this recommendation.

Also in 2013, the Canadian Snowbird Association worked in partnership with the government of British Columbia to increase the amount of time that permanent residents can be out-of-country from six to seven months, while still maintaining their provincial health coverage. Later in the same year, the CSA effectively petitioned both the Manitoba and Alberta governments to extend the length of time that residents could temporarily reside outside of Canada to a maximum of 7 months in a 12-month period.

During the following year (2014), both the province of New Brunswick and Nova Scotia made similar changes to their travel-health policies. In May 2014, due to the efforts of the CSA, the New Brunswick government increased the amount of time that Medicare beneficiaries could temporarily remain outside of the province, from six to seven months, while retaining their eligibility for continued health coverage. Months later, the government of Nova Scotia announced a similar change which was made effective on August 1, 2014. In conjunction with the increase in out-of-province health coverage, the Nova Scotia Family and Seniors' Pharmacare Programs was also amended to allow for a 270-day prescription medication supply maximum for vacation purposes. Under previous policy, beneficiaries could obtain up to a 180-day supply of medication at the discretion of their physician and pharmacist. This amendment to policy was also implemented on August 1, 2014.

United States

The government relations work of the Canadian Snowbird Association also extends to all levels of government in the United States. In 2003, a proposed rule which sought to reduce the amount of time that Canadian tourists could spend physically present in the United States, from six months to 30 days, was rescinded after the CSA appeared before the U.S. House Small Business Committee on Capitol Hill. Florida Governor Jeb Bush mentioned the CSA in his press release, recognizing the efforts of the association in the successful withdrawal of the planned legislative changes.
 
At the state level, the CSA has engaged with the Florida government on the issue of property tax. The state of Florida employs a two-tier tax system which treats residents and non-residents differently. In 2006, the Canadian Snowbird Association appeared before the Florida Property Tax Reform Committee to present the association's position on proposed property tax reform.

In 2013, the state of Florida passed legislation which required foreign drivers to obtain an International Driving Permit in order to operate a motor vehicle. The CSA worked with government representatives at the state level, and the Florida Legislature soon repealed the requirement when it reconvened.
In response to member feedback, in 2012 and 2013, the CSA lobbied the U.S. Congress to increase the amount of time that Canadian retirees could spend in the United States from six to eight months. As a result of CSA lobbying efforts, the "Canadian Retiree Visa" or "Snowbird Visa" was included in multiple bills in both the Senate and House of Representatives.

One of the bills, the JOLT Act, was attached to the comprehensive immigration reform bill which was approved by the Senate on June 27, 2013 with a final vote of 68 to 32. The JOLT Act has been referred to the Subcommittee on Immigration and Border Security in the U.S. House of Representatives.

Programs and Services

In addition to the advocacy work of the association, the CSA also provides a number of value-added programs and services which cater to the snowbird lifestyle.

CSANews

CSANews is the official news magazine of the Canadian Snowbird Association. Available in both English and French (Nouvelles << CSA >>), CSANews is published quarterly and features timely articles related to the snowbird lifestyle as well as updates on recent advocacy initiatives and accomplishments of the association. The regular columns which appear in CSANews cover a range of topics such as travel, health, finance and technology.

Snowbird Currency Exchange Program (SCEP)

The Snowbird Currency Exchange Program lets clients transfer funds automatically and / or continuously from any Canadian bank to any U.S. bank every month whether you are in the U.S. or back in Canada. The program works by pooling the funds of all participants, providing bulk purchase exchange rates. Savings are passed on to members and to other participants. Services of a leading Canadian bank are utilized and security is assured. And, no international transfer recipient fees will be charged by your U.S. bank, guaranteed.

CSA Auto Club

The CSA Auto Club is a pure reimbursement emergency roadside assistance auto club program. When a vehicle breakdown occurs, enrollees simply pay for the service and send CSA Auto Club the dated receipt within 30 days of the service call date.

Medipac Travel Medical Insurance
 
Since the restrictions on out-of-country emergency medical care were put in place in 1992, a mission of the Canadian Snowbird Association has been to
evaluate Canadian travel medical insurance plans on the basis of affordability and comprehensive coverage. Medipac Travel Insurance has received the exclusive endorsement of the Canadian Snowbird Association as the preferred travel medical insurance plan for its membership.

CSA Auto and Home Insurance

The CSA Auto and Home Insurance Plan has been specifically designed and implemented for the members of the Canadian Snowbird Association. With Group Services Insurance, you capitalize on the benefits of the CSA's purchasing power, with highly competitive rates and enhanced coverages to match the snowbird lifestyle. Clients can choose an interest free payment plan that makes the most sense for them.

CSA Medipac Personal Health Record
A Personal Health Record is a document that contains personal information about you and your medical history. Health Records vary greatly, though the objective remains to communicate a medical history to attending doctors and nurses during a medical emergency, when a patient is not able to or is
incapacitated. A Health Record should be complete in its review of a User's medical history, and it should be current.
 
The CSA Medipac Personal Health Record is a free service ("Service") for members of the Canadian Snowbird Association (CSA), as a member benefit, and registered Users of the www.snowbirds.org website.

References

External links
 Canada Health Act
 Visit-USA Act Bill

Medical and health organizations based in Ontario
Organizations established in 1992
1992 establishments in Canada
Association
Travelers organizations
1992 establishments in Ontario
Political advocacy groups in Canada